Harry Churchill Beet VC (1 April 1873 – 10 January 1946) was an English recipient of the Victoria Cross, the highest and most prestigious award for gallantry in the face of the enemy that can be awarded to British and Commonwealth forces.

Beet was 27 years old, and a corporal in the 1st Battalion, Derbyshire Regiment, British Army during the Second Boer War when the following deed took place on 22 April 1900 at Wakkerstroom, South Africa, for which he was awarded the VC:

He stayed in South Africa until after the war had ended in June 1902, and returned to the United Kingdom on the SS Syria in September that year. On his return to his hometown Long Eaton, Derbyshire, his townsmen gave him what was reported as a ″great reception″.

He later achieved the rank of captain. He later emigrated to Saskatchewan, Canada, where he fought with the Canadian Expeditionary Force in World War I. In 1936 he settled in Vancouver where he remained until his death.

His Victoria Cross is displayed at the Sherwood Foresters Museum, The Castle, Nottingham, England.

References

Monuments to Courage (David Harvey, 1999)
The Register of the Victoria Cross (This England, 1997)
Victoria Crosses of the Anglo-Boer War (Ian Uys, 2000)
Angloboerwar.com

1873 births
1946 deaths
Sherwood Foresters soldiers
Sherwood Foresters officers
British recipients of the Victoria Cross
Second Boer War recipients of the Victoria Cross
Canadian Expeditionary Force officers
British Army personnel of the Second Boer War
People from Bingham, Nottinghamshire
English emigrants to Canada
British military personnel of the Tirah campaign
British Army recipients of the Victoria Cross
Burials at Mountain View Cemetery (Vancouver)
Military personnel from Nottinghamshire